Camille Veronica Kostek (born February 19, 1992) is an American model, television host, and actress. She gained recognition for her appearances in the Sports Illustrated Swimsuit Issue, and achieved further prominence after landing a cover of the magazine's 2019 edition.

Since 2021, Kostek is the on-field host of the game show Wipeout on TBS, and since 2022 hosts NBC's Dancing With Myself. She has also appeared in the film Free Guy (2021).

Early life and education 
Kostek was born in Killingworth, Connecticut on February 19, 1992, to Alan Kostek, a general contractor, and Christina (née Decosta), a gym manager. She is the eldest of four siblings, and is of Polish, Irish and Jamaican descent. She started taking ballet lessons when she was three years old, and continued her training at Broadway Dance Center in New York City while competing nationally. At Haddam-Killingworth High School she was a cheerleader, lacrosse varsity captain, and host of her high school's broadcasting program. She majored in communications with a minor in Business at Eastern Connecticut State University. She played lacrosse for Eastern before committing full-time as a member of its dance squad and as anchor of its network show TV22. Kostek is a certified barre instructor.

Career

Professional cheerleading 
Kostek started her professional cheerleading career at age 19 with the Hartford Colonials of the United Football League.

In 2013, while a junior at university, Kostek made it to the roster of the National Football League's (NFL) New England Patriots Cheerleaders. She landed the cover of its annual Swimsuit Calendar which was shot in Saint Lucia in 2014. She also joined the NFL Tour in China as Patriots ambassador where she performed routines and taught youth cheer clinics. In addition, Kostek has featured in advertising campaigns for Patriot Place, and served as spokesperson for the cheer team in various television shows and public engagements.

In her last game before retirement, she performed at the University of Phoenix Stadium in Arizona for Super Bowl XLIX where the Patriots beat the Seattle Seahawks on February 1, 2015.

Hosting 
Kostek started as co-host of programs in ABC, CBS, and Fox affiliate channels in New England, as well as a co-anchor in WPRI-TV's The Rhode Show in 2015. She was a reporter for NESN's show Dirty Water TV from 2016 to 2017 covering travel as well as sports events including NASCAR. Since 2018, she has hosted and corresponded for South by Southwest, the Super Bowl, the National Hockey League, and Levitate Music Festival, as well as lifestyle, red carpet and sports events for Maxim and Sports Illustrated, among others. She has also co-hosted radio shows on SiriusXM.

Right out of college, Kostek was offered a job on ESPN's Saturday Night Football, but turned it down for the opportunity to travel while modeling. In September 2020, she was announced as on-field host of game show Wipeout on TBS.

Modeling 
Kostek's first modeling job was for a series of television commercials for boutique Ciao Bella in 2013 which aired on MTV, E! News, VH1, and ABC Family. She then joined her first modeling agency in Boston in 2015, and subsequently became brand ambassador and model for Benrus, Equinox Fitness, and Dune Jewelry. Her early work consisted of print and television advertisements for brands like Nissan, New Balance, and Rebag to name a few. She has done editorials for the likes of Elle, and has graced the covers of fashion and lifestyle magazines like Ocean Drive, BELLA, Haute Living, The Improper Bostonian and Bay among others.Since then, Kostek has done campaigns and ambassadorships for various clothing and cosmetic brands including L'Oréal, Victoria's Secret, and Clarins. She also did ad campaigns for fashion line Kittenish, and walked the runway for its Spring/Summer 2019 collection at New York Fashion Week. Kostek is also a longtime model and ambassador for Reebok, headlining the brand's PureMove Bra and Nano X1 campaigns among others.

Kostek initially found difficulty securing modeling representation as agencies kept telling her she was not tall enough at 5'8", or thin enough at dress size 4/6. She eventually submitted a video of her experience to the Sports Illustrated Swimsuit Issue which was conducting an open casting call at the time. She was scouted, and walked the runway for the SI Swimsuit Fashion Show during Miami Beach Swim Week in July 2017. The following month, she was photographed by Yu Tsai in Belize for her first photoshoot with the magazine for the 2018 issue. Kostek was chosen from 5,000 open casting call candidates and won the inaugural Sports Illustrated Swim Search in March 2018. She walked the runway for Miami Beach Swim Week for the second time in July 2018, and closed the show the following year. The first model announced for the 2019 issue, she did her shoot in South Australia with photographer Josie Clough, and landed a solo cover in her official year as a rookie.

Kostek has been called an "American Bombshell" and sex symbol for her blonde hair, blue eyes and curves. Connecticut Magazine named her in their "40 under 40" list of influential people of 2018, and she was included in Maxim's Hot 100 list of Sexiest Women in the World in 2019.

Acting 
Kostek made her film debut with a cameo appearance in STX Entertainment's 2018 comedy I Feel Pretty starring Amy Schumer. This was followed with a supporting role in 20th Century Studios's science fiction film Free Guy (2021) with Ryan Reynolds.

Other ventures 

Since 2018, Kostek designs her namesake jewelry collections for Dune Jewelry. In 2020, she released a clothing and accessory collection inspired by her trademarked phrase "Never Not Dancing" with Shine the Light On proceeds of which benefit mental health charities. Her body-inclusive swimsuit and loungewear collection with Swimsuits For All was released on May 3, 2021.

Kostek started touring universities and colleges in the U.S. in 2019 for her "Own It" Tour where she conducts talks on self-acceptance and body image.

Personal life 
A classically trained dancer, Kostek often posts videos of herself on social media spontaneously dancing in places outside a dance studio.

Since 2015, Kostek has been in a relationship with American football player Rob Gronkowski. They live in Foxborough, Massachusetts, and Tampa, Florida.

Filmography

Film

Television

Music videos

References

External links

Camille Kostek on New England Patriots Cheerleaders
Camille Kostek on Sports Illustrated Swimsuit Issue

1992 births
21st-century American actresses
Actresses from Connecticut
American cheerleaders
American female models
American film actresses
American people of Irish descent
American people of Jamaican descent
American people of Polish descent
American television reporters and correspondents
Eastern Connecticut State University alumni
Entertainment journalists
Female models from Connecticut
Living people
National Football League cheerleaders
People from Killingworth, Connecticut
American television hosts
American women television presenters